This is a list of castles in Edinburgh.

List

See also
Castles in Scotland
List of castles in Scotland
List of listed buildings in Edinburgh

Notes

References
 Coventry, Martin (2001) The Castles of Scotland, 3rd Ed. Scotland: Goblinshead 
 Pattullo, Nan (1974) Castles, Houses and Gardens of Scotland Edinburgh: Denburn Press

External links

 
Edinburgh
Castles